Paul Andrew Edbrooke (born 5 December 1978) is an Australian politician. He has been a Labor Party member of the Victorian Legislative Assembly since November 2014, representing the Legislative Assembly seat of Frankston.

He was raised in the Latrobe Valley, with both parents highly active in the Salvation Army, and his father a Corps Sergeant Major. Edbrooke moved to Frankston in 2001, and now lives in Mount Eliza with his family.

Edbrooke is a former teacher and firefighter with the Country Fire Authority (CFA), based at Frankston fire station. He mostly taught in Special Developmental Schools.

Over fourteen years as a career firefighter, Edbrooke worked at some of the state's largest and most complex fires, including the Dandenong Dunlopillo factory fire, Black Saturday fires and the Morwell coal mine fire, where it is recorded that he was almost killed during a night shift. The platoon he worked on at Frankston Fire Station was once known as 'deadly D shift' due to the amount of trauma they attended. In 2009, he was awarded a Chief Officer's commendation for rescuing a victim from a house fire and resuscitating her with his platoon. Two persons were rescued and one firefighter hospitalised. In 2013 he was awarded a CFA service award.  In 2014 he was awarded the National Service Medal (Black Saturday). Up until his election he was a United Firefighter's Union Shop Steward.

Edbrooke chaired the $63 million Frankston Transit Precinct Taskforce and currently chairs the same project's implementation governance board, which includes CEOs from South East Water, Peninsula Health, Chisholm TAFE and Monash University.

He is currently the Parliamentary Secretary for Police and Emergency Services and Parliamentary Secretary for Bushfire Recovery.

In January 2022, The Age reported that Edbrooke had saved the life of a seven-year-old drowning victim using cardiopulmonary resuscitation.

References

External links
 Parliamentary voting record of Paul Edbrooke at Victorian Parliament Tracker

1987 births
Living people
Australian Labor Party members of the Parliament of Victoria
Members of the Victorian Legislative Assembly
Monash University alumni
21st-century Australian politicians